Nebria rubripes is a species of ground beetle in the Nebriinae subfamily that can be found in France and Spain.

Subspecies
The species have 3 subspecies that could be found in France and Spain:
Nebria rubripes olivieri Dejean, 1826 France, Spain
Nebria rubripes rousseleti Ledoux & Roux, 1988 France
Nebria rubripes rubripes Audinet-Serville, 1821 France

References

External links
Nebria rubripes at Carabidae of the World

rubripes
Beetles described in 1821
Beetles of Europe